R. B. Ashok Babu is an Indian politician and member of the Bharatiya Janata Party. Ashok Babu is a member of the Puducherry Legislative Assembly from May 11, 2021, as he was nominated by the Central Government of India.

References 

Living people
Year of birth missing (living people)
21st-century Indian politicians
People from Puducherry
Bharatiya Janata Party politicians from Puducherry
Puducherry MLAs 2021–2026
Puducherry politicians
Nominated members of the Puducherry Legislative Assembly